52 kDa repressor of the inhibitor of the protein kinase is an enzyme that in humans is encoded by the PRKRIR gene.

Interactions
PRKRIR has been shown to interact with STK4 and DNAJC3.

References

Further reading